Mouldsworth is a civil parish in Cheshire West and Chester, England. It contains four buildings that are recorded in the National Heritage List for England as designated listed buildings, all of which are at Grade II. This grade is the lowest of the three gradings given to listed buildings and is applied to "buildings of national importance and special interest". The parish is almost completely rural, and three of the listed buildings are, or were, farmhouses; the other is a church.

See also
Listed buildings in Ashton Hayes
Listed buildings in Barrow
Listed buildings in Horton-cum-Peel
Listed buildings in Manley

References

Listed buildings in Cheshire West and Chester
Lists of listed buildings in Cheshire